William Harding (September 23, 1910 – August 18, 1936) was an American sports shooter. He competed in the 50 m rifle, prone event at the 1932 Summer Olympics. Harding was a US Army officer, and was killed in a training flight.

References

External links
 

1910 births
1936 deaths
American male sport shooters
Olympic shooters of the United States
Shooters at the 1932 Summer Olympics
Sportspeople from Shreveport, Louisiana
Aviators killed in aviation accidents or incidents in the United States
United States Army Air Forces pilots
20th-century American people